Palaemonetes vulgaris, variously known as the common American prawn, common grass shrimp, marsh grass shrimp or marsh shrimp, is a common species of shrimp in the western Atlantic Ocean from Cape Cod Bay to the Gulf of Mexico.

References

Palaemonidae
Crustaceans of the Atlantic Ocean
Crustaceans described in 1818